Claude-François-Dorothée, marquis de Jouffroy d'Abbans (30 September 1751 - 18 July 1832) was a French naval architect and engineer. He was the inventor of the first steamboat, leading to the first industrial revolution by launching a new dynamic on the waters of the globe.

In 1776, Jouffroy d'Abbans developed a 13-meter steamship, the Palmipède, in which the engine moved oars equipped with rotating blades. The ship sailed on the Doubs in June and July 1776.

  
In 1783, he made a paddle steamer named the Pyroscaphe ply on the Saône. However, the Académie des Sciences prohibited him from using his invention in Paris, and instead nominated Périer, one of de Jouffroy d'Abbans' opponents whose previous attempts had failed, to inspect the project. Further misfortunes due to the French Revolution hindered his progress.  His claim was acknowledged by Arago and in 1840 by the French Academy.  Jouffroy published Les bateaux à vapeur and wrote for the Academy Mémoires sur les pompes à feu.  Impoverished, he retired to the Hôtel des Invalides and died there of cholera.

In 1803, more than 20 years after d'Abbans' inaugural trip, Robert Fulton would succeed in sailing a steamship of his conception on the Seine.

External links
 Catholic Encyclopedia article
 The first successful steamboat

1751 births
1832 deaths
18th-century French inventors
People from Haute-Marne
People from Doubs